Quinn Sullivan may refer to:
 Quinn Sullivan (musician), American singer, songwriter and guitarist
 Quinn Sullivan (soccer), American soccer player